Meet the Pegasus (Simplified Chinese: 喜羊羊与灰太狼之飞马奇遇记, Traditional Chinese: 喜羊羊與灰太狼之飛馬奇遇記) is a 2014 Chinese animated comedy adventure family film part of the film series based on the animated television series Pleasant Goat and Big Big Wolf. It is preceded by The Mythical Ark: Adventures in Love & Happiness (2013) and is followed by Pleasant Goat and Big Big Wolf – Amazing Pleasant Goat (2015).

Plot
The Pegasus prince's wings are accidentally hit by Wolffy and thus he falls to Green-Green Grassland, which cause changes to the fairy tale in Pegasus city. The goats decide to help Pegasus prince get back to his city and surely Wolffy chases the goats all the way to Pegasus city. They go through rainbow rain, polar light sea and even to the hanging garden together with the prince, but Weslie saves the prince got ends up by crashed, everyone is sad, but both of while saves by the plane, They even help to solve the crisis caused by Wolffy in Pegasus city and bring a happy ending there.

Voice cast
Zu Liqing - Weslie
Deng Yuting - Tibbie / Jonie
Liang Ying - Paddi / Wilie
Liu Hongyun - Sparky
Gao Quansheng - Slowy
Zhang Lin - Wolffy
Zhao Na - Wolnie
Ryan Zheng - Prince Pegasus
Bai Baihe - Princess Blue

Reception
The film grossed RMB47.4 million (US$7.83 million) at the Chinese box office four days after being released.

References

External links

2010s adventure comedy films
2014 animated films
2014 films
Animated adventure films
Animated comedy films
Chinese animated films
Pleasant Goat and Big Big Wolf films
Huayi Brothers films
2014 comedy films